Pablo Maximiliano Cuadra (born 6 June 1995), known as Maximiliano Cuadra or Maxi Cuadra, is an Argentine professional footballer who plays as a forward for Greek Super League 2 club Apollon Smyrnis.

Career
Cuadra was promoted into Racing Club's senior squad in 2017, following eight years in the youth system. He made his professional debut on 12 March during a 3–0 win versus Lanús. Three appearances later, Cuadra scored for the first time by netting the winning goal in a 2–3 win away to Quilmes. Overall, he scored two goals in seventeen matches in all competitions throughout his first campaign. In that period, on 1 June 2017, Cuadra scored on his continental debut against Rionegro Águilas in the Copa Sudamericana. In January 2019, Cuadra joined Unión Santa Fe on loan. On 17 January 2020, he then joined Gimnasia La Plata on loan until 30 June 2020.

After playing for Cobreloa in the Primera B de Chile, on second half 2021 he returned to the Chilean football and joined Unión La Calera, being loaned to San Luis de Quillota.

On 9 February 2022, Cuadra joined Banfield on a deal until the end of the year.

Career statistics
.

References

External links

1995 births
Living people
People from San Nicolás de los Arroyos
People from San Nicolás Partido
Argentine footballers
Argentine expatriate footballers
Association football forwards
Argentine Primera División players
Primera B de Chile players
Chilean Primera División players
Racing Club de Avellaneda footballers
Unión de Santa Fe footballers
Club de Gimnasia y Esgrima La Plata footballers
Cobreloa footballers
Unión La Calera footballers
Club Atlético Banfield footballers
San Luis de Quillota footballers
Expatriate footballers in Chile
Argentine expatriate sportspeople in Chile
Argentine expatriates in Chile
Sportspeople from Buenos Aires Province